Atlantic Grupa d.d. is a Croatian multinational company whose business operations include the production, development, sales and distribution of consumer goods with simultaneous market presence in over 40 countries around the world.

Atlantic Grupa is one of the leading FMCG companies in the region. Its primary activities comprise production and distribution of food products, including sports nutrition products and dietary supplements. Additionally, Atlantic Grupa is also a manufacturer of over-the-counter drug medicines and the company also operates Farmacia chain of pharmacies. Finally, Atlantic Grupa has regional and international distribution network through which, in addition to its own range of brands, it also distributes a range of products from external partners.

The company's headquarters are in Zagreb, while 17 production facilities are located in Croatia, Slovenia, Bosnia & Herzegovina, Serbia and North Macedonia. Atlantic Grupa owns companies and representative offices in 10 countries.

History

1991–2001: Foundation and domestic expansion
The beginning of Atlantic Grupa dates back to 1991 when Atlantic Trade d.o.o., a company for distribution of consumer goods, was founded. In the following years, the company grew into a national distributor with distribution centres in Zagreb, Split, Rijeka and Osijek and a distribution portfolio from principals such as Wrigley, Procter & Gamble, Johnson & Johnson, etc.

In 1991, Atlantic Trade was incorporated and the development of consumer goods distribution started across Croatia.

In 1997, the company invested in the "Ataco" distribution system in Bosnia & Herzegovina. In 1998, Atlantic Grupa launched the first Croatian ready-made sandwich for broad distribution named Montana.

2001–present: Regional expansion
With the opening of the representative office in Bosnia & Herzegovina in 2001 the company became a regional company, which was in later years followed by own distribution companies in Serbia, North Macedonia and Slovenia. In addition to being a distribution company, with the acquisition of Cedevita d.o.o. in 2001, Atlantic Grupa also became a production company.

In 2001, Atlantic Grupa acquired Croatian instant vitamin drink producer Cedevita d.o.o. In the following year, it incorporated Atlantic Grupa d.o.o.

In 2003, it acquired Croatian cosmetics company Neva d.o.o. It also started up a distribution company Atlantic Trade Skopje d.o.o. In 2004, the Croatian manufacturer of all-purpose skin and lip balm Melem, was purchased in the same year.

In 2005, Atlantic Grupa acquired German sports food producer Multipower, which marked the first acquisition outside of former Yugoslavia. In 2006, the company established a representative office in Moscow. In the same year, the company was transformed into a joint stock company.

In 2007, it purchased Fidifarm, leading Croatian producer of OTC medicines
Also, it acquired Serbian instant vitamin drink producer Multivita d.o.o., thus cementing leadership status in the region in the industry of vitamin drinks. In the same year, after the implementation of the initial public offering of shares, Atlantic Grupa d.d. was listed on the official market of the Zagreb Stock Exchange.

In 2008 the company started to acquire pharmacy institutions and form its own pharmacy chain Farmacia. In 2010, it purchased Droga Kolinska, the leading Slovenian food producer, for 382 million euros. The acquisition of Kalničke Vode Bio Natura d.d. came in the same year.

In 2013, the company established a cooperation with Unilever. In 2015, Atlantic Grupa acquired Foodland, Serbian producer of homemade fruit and vegetable products e.g. jams, juices   As of 2018, Atlantic Grupa is among the leading Croatian companies in terms of sales, with the annual revenue reaching 718 million euros for 2018 calendar year.

Organisation

Organisational structure
The business organisation of Atlantic Grupa comprises two basic segments:

Business operations of Atlantic Grupa may be followed through business activities of special business units related to individual product type, and special sales units which cover all major markets as well as strategic sales channels.
Corporate support functions are centrally organised and, depending on their respective functional area, provide support to the development and management of the entire Atlantic Grupa.

Corporate government
Atlantic Grupa's corporate management structure is based on a dual system consisting of the company's Supervisory Board and Management Board. Together with the General Assembly, a body in which shareholders accomplish their rights in Company matters, they represent the three principal bodies of the company.

Management Board

Atlantic Grupa's Management Board is composed of the President and CEO, Vice President for Finance, Vice President for Corporate Affairs, Vice President for Strategy, Business development and Growth, Vice President for Distribution and Vice President for Savoury spreads, Donat Mg and international expansion. Alongside the management board operates the Strategic Management Council which represents a multifunctional body dealing with vital strategic and operational corporate issues.

 Emil Tedeschi: President of the Management Board
 Zoran Stanković: Vice President for Finance
 Neven Vranković: Vice President for Corporate Affairs
 Lada Tedeschi Fiorio: Group Vice President for Strategy, Business development and Growth
 Srećko Nakić: Group Vice President for Distribution
 Enzo Smrekar: Group Vice President for Savoury spreads, Donat Mg and international expansion

Supervisory Board

Supervisory Board of Atlantic Grupa comprises seven members, representatives of the academic and business community as well as shareholders. Members of supervisory board are:

 Zdenko Adrović: President
 Siniša Petrović: Deputy of the President of the Supervisory Board
 Lars Peter Elam Håkansson: Member
 Franz-Josef Flosbach: Member
 Saša Pekač: Member
 Anja Svetina Nabergoj: Member

Brands

Atlantic's Brands
Atlantic Grupa develops its Brands in 6 Strategic Business Units (SBU): Beverages, Coffee, Snacks, Savoury Spreads, Pharma and Personal Care, and Sports and Functional Food

Beverages
Cedevita
Multivita
Cockta
Donat Mg
Kala
Kalnička
Coffee
Barcaffè
Grand kafa
Bonito
Snacks
Smoki
Najlepše želje
Bananica
Chipsos
Prima
Sweet
Štark waffles
Štark cookies
Savoury Spreads
Argeta
Argeta Exclusive
Argeta Junior
Argeta Delight
Granny's Secret
Amfissa
Montana
Pharma and Personal Care
Farmacia
Dietpharm
Fidifarm
Bebi
Bebi premium
Sports and Functional Foods
Multipower
Champ
Multaben

Principals' Brands
Atlantic Grupa distributes the entire product range from Atlantic's own production and the assortment of external principals. In Croatia, Serbia, Slovenia, North Macedonia, Russia and Austria, Atlantic owns its own distribution companies while distribution in B&H and Montenegro is organised in cooperation with the partner company Ataco.

Atlantic Grupa's portfolio is approximately 70% Atlantic's Brands with the rest being Principals' Brands. 
 Distribution 
Unilever
Ferrero
Hipp
Johnson & Johnson
Mars
Nestle
Red Bull
Duracell
Wrigley
SAB Miller
Beam Suntory
Schwartau
Vitamin Well

References

External links
 

Food and drink companies of Croatia
Companies listed on the Zagreb Stock Exchange
Conglomerate companies established in 1991
1991 establishments in Croatia
Retail companies of Croatia
Companies based in Zagreb
KK Cedevita
Sponsor